Vyacheslav Mikhailovich Podberyozkin (born 21 June 1992) is a Russian professional football player who plays for FC Ural Yekaterinburg. He primarily plays as an attacking midfielder though he has also played as a winger, wide midfielder or central midfielder.

Club career
He made his Russian Premier League debut for FC Lokomotiv Moscow on 22 April 2012 in a game against FC Rubin Kazan.

Podberyozkin signed for Krasnodar on 31 December 2015.

On 5 January 2018 he joined FC Rubin Kazan on loan.

On 29 May 2018 he moved to Rubin on a permanent basis, signing a 3-year contract.

On 18 August 2020 he returned to FC Ural Yekaterinburg.

Career statistics

Club

References

External links
 
 

1992 births
Footballers from Moscow
Living people
Russian footballers
Russia youth international footballers
Russia under-21 international footballers
Association football midfielders
FC Lokomotiv Moscow players
FC Khimki players
FC Ural Yekaterinburg players
FC Krasnodar players
FC Rubin Kazan players
Russian Premier League players
Russian Second League players